Shallow Grave is the debut studio album by Swedish folk musician The Tallest Man on Earth. It was released on 5 March 2008 by the record label Gravitation.

Shallow Grave borrows heavily from American folk music and includes many references to the lyrics of such music as well as antiquated terminology of the American lexicon, albeit seen through the lens of a Northern European. "The Gardener" was released as the album's first single.

Track listing

References

2008 debut albums
The Tallest Man on Earth albums
Dead Oceans albums